Peont is a village  and a Panchayat at Nissing tehsil in Karnal district in the Indian state of Haryana. It comes under Chirao block. The village is located about 22 km from Karnal on Assandh road National Highway  709A. It is well connected to Jundla via Assandh road 9 km & Gondar road 11 km Pacca khera road 6 km

Geography
It has an average elevation of 253 metres (777 feet).

Physiography
The village lies in Nardak, Khadir and Bangar area.  It has four ponds and two large draining rivers, one flowing from the north east and another flowing from the north west and forming one river which flows to the south.

Demographics
People of this village speak in Haryanvi. Hindi and Punjabi language is the local language.

Administration
Village administration comes under Nilokheri sub-division of Karnal district. It is one among the 44 panchayat of Nissing at Chirao block of Karnal. Polling strength is 2363.

Social structure
Peont is a village in agricultural belt having mostly Ror & Sikh families along with other agricultural communities.

Utility services
The water supply in Peont is managed by its Jal Board and is very well managed. Peont's Electric Supply Undertaking is managed by the Uttar Haryana Bijli Vitran Nigam. Bharat Sanchar Nigam Limited provides tele-services for landline, mobile, and many other services. Many private telecom operators are also offering their services in the city as Vodafone Essar, Airtel, Idea, Reliance, Tata, MTS, Aircel.

Commercial banks
There are various banks facilitating people of the town as well as other from nearby areas. Automated teller machines of these banks are also situated all over the town for the facility of banking activities.

Post Office
The pin code of Peont is 132036 and postal head office is at Jundla.

Transport

Railways
There is no railway station within 10 km. Bazida Jatan Railway Station and Gharaunda Railway Station are major railway stations 18 & 21  km away, respectively. However, the most accessible main station for passengers is Karnal which is 21 km away.

Roadways
There is a national highway 709A road connecting Karnal to Peont to Assandh National highway 709A Assandh road serving the purpose of connectivity of nearby towns and villages.
It is located 22 km to the west of district headquarters Karnal, 9 km from Nissang, and 143 km from state capital Chandigarh.

Temples
There is a big Gururavi dass Temple,
Shiv Temple and Sikh Temple (Gurudwara).

Employment and education
The village has approximately 8,500 inhabitants The main occupations are agriculture, farming and cattle breeding.

Colleges
Diet Shahpur

Schools
 Govt Middle School (right side)	
 Govt Middle School (left side)	
 Geeta Sr. Sec. School

Nearby places

Nearby villages
Agond 5 km
Jundla
Bansa 5 km
Chirao
Gonder 6 km
Jani
Katleri 3 km
Kheri Naroo
Padha
Picholia
Sheikhpura Manchuri

Nearby cities
Gharaunda  20 km
Karnal  22 km
Assandh  25 km
Taraori  26 km
Nilokheri 30 km

See also
Nissing
Karnal

References

Villages in Karnal district
Karnal